Albian Sands Energy Inc. is the operator of the Muskeg River Mine and Jack Pine Mine, an oil sands mining project located  north of Fort McMurray, Alberta, Canada. It is a joint venture between Shell Canada (10%), CNRL (70%) and Chevron Canada (20%).  The company's legal headquarters are located in the Shell Tower in Calgary, Alberta. Albian Sands got its name from the Albian Boreal Sea which, during the Albian stage of the Cretaceous (over 100 million years ago), moved over the McMurray sands and deposited a blanket of marine shale on its floor which trapped the hydrocarbons of the McMurray Formation. The oil sands resources of the Muskeg River Mine are a legacy of the Albian Sea.

At full production, Albian Sands can produce  of crude bitumen, a naturally occurring semi-solid form of crude oil. The mine product, diluted bitumen or dilbit, is sent to be upgraded at the Scotford Upgrader in Fort Saskatchewan. The Muskeg River Mine, Jack Pine Mine and the Scotford Upgrader together comprise the Athabasca Oil Sands Project (AOSP).

A proposed future mine expansion would increase production by 100,000 bbl/day. The  (incremental) expansion project received regulatory approval in late 2006.

At the mine site, the 175 megawatt MRM Cogeneration plant owned 70% by ATCO Power and 30% by SaskPower supplies process steam and electricity to the mine. 50% of the electricity produced is surplus to mine needs and is sold into the Alberta power grid. The Corridor Pipeline which transports diluted bitumen from the Muskeg River Mine to the Scotford Upgrader is owned by Inter Pipeline Ltd. To accommodate its workforce, the project has built a 2460-room "village" with service and recreation facilities.

The project is using satellite based imaging to ensure transparent reporting of its land use.

References

External links

Oil companies of Canada
Athabasca oil sands
Joint ventures
Marathon Oil
Shell plc subsidiaries
Chevron Corporation
Companies based in Calgary
Regional Municipality of Wood Buffalo